Blowing Up Right Now is a 2019 American adventure romantic comedy film written by Chris Lee Hill, directed by Tom Morris and starring Sujata Day, Danny Jolles, Maria Blasucci, Corey Sorenson and Galadriel Stineman.

Cast
Danny Jolles as Shep
Sujata Day as Mandy
Maria Blasucci as Kim
Corey Jantzen as Nick
Galadriel Stineman as Beth
Kelli Maroney as Ruth
Pete Gardner as John
Corey Sorenson as Fred Marzulla

Release
The film was released on June 15, 2019.

Reception
Caryn James of The Hollywood Reporter gave the film a negative review, calling it "painless and pleasant enough to watch, but there’s nothing to set this comedy above a gazillion other, fresher works streaming all around us."

Nick Rocco Scalia of Film Threat rated the film an 8 out of 10 and wrote, "this smart, fun, heartfelt little indie film deserves to blow up, right now."

References

External links
 
 

2010s English-language films